Al-Anbiyaʼ ("The Prophets")  is the 21st chapter (sūrah) of the Quran with 112 verses (āyāt). Regarding the timing and contextual background of the believed revelation (asbāb al-nuzūl), it is an earlier "Meccan surah", which means it is believed to have been revealed in Mecca, rather than later in Medina. Its principal subject matter is prophets of the past, who also preached the same faith as Muhammad.

Summary
1-4 The judgment of careless and mocking Quraysh near
5 The Makkan people regard Muhammad as “a forger”
6 Miracles not performed by Muhammad because former nations received no benefit from seeing them
7-8 The former prophets were but mortal men
9 God favors His prophets but judges infidels
10 The Quraysh mentioned in the Quran
11-15 The unbelieving cities and scoffers destroyed
16-17 The heavens and the earth not created in play
18 The truth must triumph
19-22 Angels serve God, therefore not to be worshipped
23 God is sovereign
24 The great sin of idolatry
25 All apostles testified to God’s unity
26 Angels are not the daughters of God but only 'His' honored servants 
27-28 Angelic intercession only by divine permission 
29 The doom of angels who usurp divine honors
30-33 God’s works the proof of His divinity 
34-35 No human is immortal, all souls will taste death and be returned to God
36-37 Muhammad regarded by the Makkans as a scoffer
38-39 Men hasty to call down divine wrath on themselves
40 Threatened vengeance will descend suddenly
41-42 The doom of those who mocked former prophets
43-44 The gods of the idolaters unable to deliver their votaries, God will triumph over the infidels
45-46 Muhammad only a warner, the deaf will not hear the warnings of God
47 God will judge righteously
48-50 Moses and Aaron, like Muhammad, received a revelation
 The Story of Abraham
51 He receives a revelation 52-56 Reproaches his father and people with idolatry 57 He devises a plot to destroy the idols 58 He destroys the idols of the Chaldeans 59-61 He is accused before the people 62-63 He lays the blame on the largest idol
64-65 The Chaldeans at first disposed to repent, but they draw back 66-67 Abraham reproaches them for their idolatry 68 They command him to be burned alive 69-70 God miraculously delivers him
71-73 He receives the promise of Isaac and Jacob
74-75 Lot delivered from Sodom
76 Noah delivered from the Flood 
77 The rejecters of Noah drowned for being evil
78-80 The wisdom of David and Solomon, the hills and birds sang with David
81-82 Winds and demons subject to Solomon
83-84 Job is delivered from his affliction
85-86 Other prophets receive mercy from God
87-88 Jonah repents to God and is saved from affliction
89-90 Zachariah’s prayer answered
91 The miraculous conception of Jesus through the virgin Mary
92-93 The true religion is one, but Jews and Christians have sects
94 The faithful certain to be rewarded
95-97 Infidels to be judged at the resurrection
98-100 Idolaters with their gods to be cast into hell
101-103 The reward of the righteous
104 The heavens to be rolled away at the judgment
105-106 The righteous shall inherit the earth
107-109 Muhammad is a mercy to mankind and an informer
110-111 God knows the secret thoughts of the infidels
112 God will judge the infidels and show mercy to His prophet

Historical context
Muslims believe this surah was revealed in the Second Meccan Period and is listed as Number 65 according to the Nöldeke Chronology. Within its verses are found numerous evocations of earlier Judeo-Christian prophets. These examples help to emphasize and define Muhammad's role as a messenger within the Quranic context. Additionally, the incorporation of pre-existing Biblical and Judaic scriptures integrate Muhammad's prophetic mission into a larger religious framework, thus broadening the horizons of both the Quran as a text and Islam as a religious movement. The surah is thematically and stylistically characteristic of the Second Meccan Period. The verses identify the religious agency of Muhammad by relating him to preexisting Judeo-Christian figures, and from there illustrate common notional doctrines, such as: Islamic eschatology embodied in the Day of Judgment, the fates of the disbelievers and the believers, and the mercy of God. In terms of ordering and delivery, surah 21 contains a tripartite composition and traceable "ring structure", in which the path of revelation comes full circle through the sequence of three distinct parts.  Consisting of 112 verses in total, The Prophets maintains the Quran's distinctive voice, in which the verses seem conscious of their own revelation and also depend on other Surahs to illustrate particular messages. This clear self-reference, or "self-declaration", and intertextuality are perceptibly unique to the Quran and possess the book with a consciousness distinct from other religious texts.

Exegesis

1-40 the oneness of God
Affirm the revelation and commits Muhammad to his role as the chosen prophet. It declares the oneness of God in his creation.

41-49 the narratives of earlier prophets
Seek to draw examples of faith and righteousness through the narratives of earlier prophets. This method of revelation simultaneously thrusts the Quran upward and integrates the religious identity of Islam into a broader existing context.

73 doing of good deeds, establishment of prayer, and giving of zakah
In a letter to his companions, Ja'far al-Sadiq describes the importance of obedience to the prophets of Allah and cites the following in support of this: "And We made them Imams guiding by Our command. And We inspired to them the doing of good deeds, establishment of prayer, and giving of zakah; and they were worshippers of Us."(21:73)

92-112 divergent fates of believers and non-believers
Work to conclude the surah with another affirmation of revelation, this time through identification of the divergent fates of the believers and non-believers on the Day of Judgment. The chapter ends with a final exaltation of Allah's merciful nature.

References

External links

Quran 21 Clear Quran translation
Q21:2, 50+ translations, islamawakened.com

Anbiya
Abraham in Islam
David
Solomon
Lot (biblical person)
Isaac
Jacob
Noah
Job (biblical figure)
Gog and Magog
John the Baptist